The McLaren M4B was a Formula One racing car constructed by Trojan for Bruce McLaren Motor Racing and raced five times by New Zealander Bruce McLaren at the start of 1967.

The M4B was based on the M4A Formula 2 car as a stopgap between the M2B and the M5A. Additional fuel tanks were added either side of the cockpit to allow the car to run a full Grand Prix distance, and the rear end of the car was cut away to accommodate a 2.0 litre BRM type 56-2 V8, an enlarged and updated version of the engine with which Graham Hill had won the World Championship in 1962.

The car made its debut in the 1967 Race of Champions at Brands Hatch, showing promise with fourth and sixth places in the heats before a missed gear by McLaren in the final race put him out with engine failure. In the Spring Trophy at Oulton Park McLaren managed fifth place in both heats and the race, and came fifth again in the International Trophy at Silverstone.

1967 Grand Prix season 
The M4B's Grand Prix debut came at Monaco, where its short wheelbase made it surprisingly competitive. McLaren ran as high as third before a pit stop to replace a flat battery dropped him back to fourth at the finish - the first points scored by a McLaren chassis that season.

At the next event, the Dutch Grand Prix,  Bruce McLaren finished 14th in qualifying. On the second lap of the race, McLaren crashed out, running the only M4B. The car was later repaired, but caught fire during a test at Goodwood and was written off.

Formula One World Championship results 
(key) (Results in bold indicate pole position; results in italics indicate fastest lap)

Non-Championship results
(key) (results in bold indicate pole position; results in italics indicate fastest lap)

References

Citations

Sources
http://www.oldracingcars.com/mclaren/m4b/
http://www.ddavid.com/formula1/brmp56.htm
http://www.grandprix.com/gpe/rr152.html
https://web.archive.org/web/20070927213214/http://www.bruce-mclaren.com/the-cars/f2/m4b

McLaren M04B
1967 Formula One season cars